Xenocerus deletus is a species of beetles from the family Anthribidae, also known as fungus weevils.

Description 
The basic colour is dark brown, with white markings on the head, the pronotum and the elytra. This species exhibits a strong sexual dimorphism, with very different sizes in males and females. The antennae in the males are thread-like and much longer than the body.

Distribution 
This species can be found in Sumatra, Borneo and Malay Peninsula.

References 

 Biolib
 Global species

Anthribidae
Beetles described in 1860
Taxa named by Francis Polkinghorne Pascoe